The 2003 UEFA Regions' Cup was the third UEFA Regions' Cup. It was held in Germany and won by the Piedmont–Aosta Valley team from Italy, which beat France's Maine 2–1 in the final.

Preliminary round 
The 40 teams entered were drawn into ten groups of four, with the following countries hosting each group's matches:
Group 1 – 
Group 2 – 
Group 3 – 
Group 4 – 
Group 5 – 
Group 6 – 
Group 7 – 
Group 8 – 
Group 9 – 
Group 10 – 
Six group winners qualified automatically, while the winners of four randomly drawn groups took part in a playoff for the two remaining places in the tournament final.

Group 1

Group 2

Group 3

Group 4

Group 5

Group 6

Group 7

Group 8

Group 9

Group 10

Intermediary round 
The intermediary playoffs were drawn at random when the preliminary groups were drawn. As there were ten groups but only eight places in the tournament final, four group winners had to play in the intermediary round. The winners of Group 2 were drawn to play the winners of Group 4, whilst Group 8 and Group 10's winners would play each other. The two legs were played in both competing teams' home regions.

|}

First legs

Second legs

Tournament final 
Germany was chosen to host the Tournament final, with matches being played from 22-28 June 2003.

Group stage 
The six automatic preliminary group winners and the two intermediary playoff winners (Italy's Piedmont–Aosta Valley and Asturias of Spain) were drawn into two groups of four, with the two group winners advancing to the final.

Group A

Group B

Final

See also 
UEFA Regions' Cup

References

External links
Official UEFA Regions' Cup site
RSSSF page for the 2003 UEFA Regions' Cup

2003
Regions' Cup
International association football competitions hosted by Germany
Reg